Grant Township is a township in Crawford County, Kansas, United States.  As of the 2010 census, its population was 236.

Geography
According to the USGS, it contains two cemeteries: Mills and Spangler.

References

 USGS Geographic Names Information System (GNIS)

External links
 City-Data.com

Townships in Crawford County, Kansas
Townships in Kansas